Lars Nieuwpoort (born 29 October 1994, in Den Helder) is a Dutch professional footballer who plays as a centre-back for RKC Waalwijk in the Eredivisie. He formerly played for Almere City.

References

External links
 
 Voetbal International profile 

1994 births
Living people
People from Den Helder
Dutch footballers
Footballers from North Holland
Association football central defenders
Eredivisie players
Eerste Divisie players
Almere City FC players
De Graafschap players
RKC Waalwijk players